Presidential elections were held in Cameroon on 14 January 1984. The country was a one-party state at the time, with the Cameroonian National Union as the sole legal party. Its leader, Paul Biya, was the only candidate in the election, and won unopposed. Voter turnout was 97.7%.

Results

References

Cameroon
President
Presidential elections in Cameroon
One-party elections
Single-candidate elections
Cameroon